Special Affect (originally called Special Affects) was an American new wave band active from the late 1970s until 1981. They were notable for comprising the earliest-known recordings of future Ministry founder Al Jourgensen, future My Life with the Thrill Kill Kult vocalist Frank Nardiello, future Concrete Blonde drummer Harry Rushakoff, and bassist Martin Sorenson.

The band released a 7" EP called Mood Music in 1979. This release features original guitarist Tom Hoffman, who left the band in 1979 and was replaced by Jourgensen. "Vertigo Feeling", from this EP, would eventually be widely released on the Rykodisc CD Industrial Family Platter!, a compilation of songs by Ministry and My Life with the Thrill Kill Kult. Special Affect's only album, Too Much Soft Living, which was released in 1981, was advertised as the original soundtrack to a film of the same name; however, no such film exists.

Special Affect moved to San Francisco for a brief period with support from a financier, however during a gig Rushakoff and Jourgensen had an altercation on stage, which resulted in the group disbanding. Jourgensen misremembered this gig as taking place at the DNA Lounge, but the DNA Lounge did not open until 1985, years after Special Affect had ceased being a band. 

Two songs on Ministry's Early Trax compilation, "I'm Falling" and "Overkill", date back to the time of Special Affect, and feature Special Affect's bassist Martin Sorenson.

References 

 
American new wave musical groups
Musical groups from Chicago
Musical groups established in 1978
Musical groups disestablished in 1981